Leonardo Rubén Isaula George (born 8 February 1977) is a Honduran midfielder who currently plays for Atlético Choloma in the Liga Nacional de Honduras.

Club career
Isaula made his debut in senior football on 17 September 1995, when he played for Independiente Villela against Honduran giants F.C. Motagua. He scored his first goal three years later, also against Motagua. He then had a long spell with Real España and also played for Municipal Valencia and Hispano before finally playing for F.C. Motagua himself. After another stint at Hispano, Isaula joined Necaxa in summer 2010 and signed for Atlético Choloma for the 2012 Apertura season.

In November 2012, Isaula became only the second player to reach 440 matches in Honduran football, behind Denilson Costa.

International career
Isaula made his debut for Honduras in an April 2003 friendly match against Colombia, his only international match.

References

External links

 

1977 births
Living people
People from Yoro Department
Association football midfielders
Honduran footballers
Honduras international footballers
Hispano players
Independiente Villela players
F.C. Motagua players
Real C.D. España players
C.D. Honduras Progreso players
Liga Nacional de Fútbol Profesional de Honduras players